Lists of ambassadors of Iran is divided into:

List of Iranian Ambassadors to Australia
List of Iranian Ambassadors to the United Kingdom
List of Iranian ambassadors under President Khatami
List of current ambassadors from Iran

Lists of ambassadors by country of origin